Trans is a commune in the Mayenne department in north-western France.

See also
Communes of the Mayenne department

References

Communes of Mayenne